= Brophy Hill =

Summit in Jackson County, Oregon, U.S.

Coordinates: 42°26′00″N 122°34′35″W

Highest point
- Prominence: 2,119 ft (646 m)

Naming
- Etymology: Vern Brophy Whome

Geography
- Location: Jackson County, Oregon, U.S.

Geology
- Mountain type: Summit

Brophy Hill is a summit in Jackson County, Oregon, United States. The elevation is 2,119 feet (646 m).

Brophy Hill was named in the 1930s after Vern Brophy Whome, a local cattleman.
